The Seeds of Time is a collection of science fiction short stories by British writer John Wyndham, published in 1956 by Michael Joseph.  The title is presumably from Macbeth, Act I Scene III.

Contents
The collection contains:

 A foreword by John Wyndham
 "Chronoclasm", a time-travelling romantic comedy.
 "Time To Rest", depicting the life on Mars of a human survivor of the destruction of Earth. A sequel "No Place Like Earth" appears in the collection No Place Like Earth (2003), which contains both; both also appeared dramatised together in 1965 as “No Place Like Earth”, the first episode of the BBC2 series, Out of the Unknown.
 "Meteor",  in which alien visitors to Earth find themselves on a very different scale to humans.
 "Survival", set on a spacecraft marooned in orbit around Mars.  A BBC Radio 4 adaption was broadcast in 1989 with Stephen Garlick, Susan Sheridan, and Nicholas Courtney.  It was released as an Audiobook in 2007 with the 1981 version of The Chrysalids.
 "Pawley's Peepholes", another time travel story, this time playing it as comedy.
 "Opposite Number", which plays with the concept of parallel universes.
 "Pillar To Post". The central character is a paraplegic who was badly injured in a wartime attack.  Frequently taking drugs to cope with the pain, he finds himself in a healthy body very far in the future.  A complex plot of body-swapping and time travel ensues.  It is considered by some people to be the best story in the collection.
 "Dumb Martian", a satire on racism, featuring an Earthman who buys a Martian wife.
 "Compassion Circuit", a horror story on the subject of robotics.
 "Wild Flower", which explores the tension between nature and technology.

References

1956 short story collections
Short story collections by John Wyndham
Science fiction short story collections
Michael Joseph books